Nausicaa is an oil painting by Frederic Leighton, first exhibited in 1878.

History 
Nausicaa, a full-length girlish figure, in green and white draperies, standing in a doorway, was shown at the annual exhibition of the Royal Academy of Arts in 1878 alongside three other pictures by Leighton: Winding the Skein, Serafina (another single figure), and A Study.

Description 
Edgcumbe Staley describes the painting thus:

See also 

 Academic art
 Nausicaa

References

Sources 

 Jones, Stephen, et al. (1996). Frederic Leighton, 1830–1896. Royal Academy of Arts, London: Harry N. Abrams, Inc. pp. 77, 185, 186, 188.
 Rhys, Ernest (1900). Frederic Lord Leighton: An Illustrated Record of his Life and Work. London: George Bell & Sons. pp. 37–38, 126.
 Staley, Edgcumbe (1906). Lord Leighton of Stretton. London: The Walter Scott Publishing Co., Ltd.; New York: Charles Scribner's Sons. pp. 113, 217, 220, 221.

1878 paintings
Mythological paintings by Frederic Leighton
Paintings based on the Odyssey